Aalborg University (AAU) is a Danish public university with campuses in Aalborg, Esbjerg, and Copenhagen founded in 1974. The university awards bachelor's degrees, master's degrees, and PhD degrees in a wide variety of subjects within humanities, social sciences, information technology, design, engineering, exact sciences, and medicine.

History 
The idea of a university in the North Jutland Region started in 1961 when the North Jutland Committee for higher education institutions was established. On 19 August 1969 the Aalborg University Association was founded and a planning group was established with Eigil Hastrup as chairman. The same year in December, about 1,000 people from North Jutland demonstrated in front of the Folketinget (the Danish Parliament) for their cause.

In 1970, a law about the establishment of a university centre in Aalborg was passed in the Danish Parliament. In 1972, it was decided that the first rector of the new university center should be the Swedish historian and professor Jörgen Weibull. On 1 September 1974, Aalborg University Center (AUC) was inaugurated by Queen Margrethe II of Denmark. Jørgen Weibull was replaced by Sven Caspersen as rector of Aalborg University Center (AUC) in 1976. At the same time, a new management organization was established under a consistory. The first formal cooperation agreement was signed with the University of Wisconsin–Green Bay in 1980. The North Jutland knowledge park was established in 1989 as a neighbor to Aalborg University Center (AUC).

In 1993, external representatives joined the consistory. In 1994, Aalborg University Center (AUC) changed its name to Aalborg University (AAU). Aalborg University - Esbjerg was established through a merger between the engineering college in Esbjerg and Aalborg University in 1995. In 1998, the NOVI science park was connected to Aalborg University. Aalborg University Copenhagen was formed in collaboration with the engineering college in Copenhagen in 2003. A new university board was formed and joined by its members on 1 February 2004, with Jørgen Østergaard appointed as rector. In 2005, Finn Kjærsdam was hired by the university board as rector. Aalborg University and the Danish Building Research Institute merged in 2007. In 2010, Aalborg University established a faculty of Medicine and created a medical education. Per Michael Johansen was hired as rector by the university board in 2014.

List of rectors of Aalborg University 
Since Aalborg University was founded in 1974 the university has had a total of 5 rectors in office.

Profile 
Aalborg University differentiates itself from the older and more traditional Danish universities with its focus on interdisciplinary, inter-faculty studies; an experimental curriculum based on an interdisciplinary basic course with subsequent specialisation; a pedagogical structure based on problem-centred, real-life projects of educational and research relevance – which internationally has become known and recognised as The Aalborg Model. With the problem-based, project-organised model, semesters at AAU are centred around complex real-life problems which students attempt to find answers to in a scientific manner while working together in groups. In February 2007, the foundation of the UICEE Centre for Problem Based Learning (UCPBL) paid recognition to Aalborg University, which subsequently led to the appointment of AAU as UNESCO Chair in problem-based learning.

University rankings 

In one of the latest rankings from 2021, Aalborg University (AAU) was ranked as the eight best university in the world and as the best in Europe within engineering.

In a Massachusetts Institute of Technology study which analyzed the global state of art in the engineering education, Aalborg University was named as the leading university in Europe in engineering education by 50 thought leaders from all over the world.

In 2021, Times Higher Education Impact Rankings ranked Aalborg University number 6 in the world, out of 1,117 universities from 94 countries/regions, against the United Nations' Sustainable Development Goals. That is the number 1 university in the European Union (EU). In 2022, Times Higher Education Impact Rankings ranked Aalborg University (AAU) as the best university in the world in Sustainable Development Goal 4 (Quality Education) for the third year in a row.

For the academic year 2023, in overall terms, Aalborg University (AAU) has significantly dropped in worldwide university rankings, according to THE and QS. In addition, the Danish university dropped even more drastically in worldwide academic rankings during 2022 according to ARWU.

Administration and organisation 
The university is governed by a board consisting of 11 members as follows:

 Six members recruited outside the university form the majority of the board;
 Two members are appointed by the scientific staff;
 One member is appointed by the administrative staff;
 Two members are appointed by the university students.

The rector is appointed by the university board. The rector in turn appoints deans, and deans appoint heads of departments. There is no faculty senate and faculty are not involved in the appointment of rector, deans, or department heads. Hence the university has no faculty governance.

Campuses
Aalborg University has campuses in Aalborg, Esbjerg, and Copenhagen.

Esbjerg 

Aalborg University Esbjerg (AAU-Esbjerg) is an organisational unit (department) under Aalborg University, but is geographically located in Esbjerg. The institute's official name is "Esbjerg Technical Institute", formerly the "Department of Chemistry and Applied Engineering."

AAUE has approximately 500 students and educates mainly engineers, but also offers a number of niche programmes such as fishing technology and a graduate degree in computer science education (Bachelor of Science in software engineering).

Aalborg University Esbjerg was created through a merger of Engineering College Esbjerg and Aalborg University in 1995. Since the merger, the number of applicants for Aalborg University Esbjerg has risen steadily and therefore there have been a need for extensions of the physical environment in several stages.

The university offers programmes in information technology, with a Department of Software and Media Technology.

The student organisation at AAU-Esbjerg is called DSR-SE and the student bar is called "The Loophole".

Faculties and departments 
Aalborg University has five faculties with a number of departments:

 Faculty of Humanities
 Department of Communication and Psychology 
 Department of Culture and Learning 
  Faculty of Social Sciences
 AAU Business School 
 Department of Law 
 Department of Politics and Society  
 Department of Sociology and Social Work 
 Technical Faculty of IT and Design
 Department of Electronic Systems 
 Department of Computer Science 
 Department of Architecture, Design, and Media Technology 
 Department of Planning 
 Faculty of Engineering and Science
 Department of the Built Environment 
 Department of Materials and Production
 Department of Chemistry and Bioscience 
 Department of Mathematical Sciences 
 Department of AAU Energy
 Faculty of Medicine
 Department of Health Science and Technology 
 Department of Clinical Medicine

Library and Press 
Aalborg University Library is a public research library for the North Jutland region. The library's primary mission is to support research and education at Aalborg University by providing appropriate information and documentation. The main branch of the University Library is located at Kroghstræde 3 in Aalborg, which is linked to smaller branches located on other campuses in Aalborg, Esbjerg, and Copenhagen.

Aalborg University through Aalborg University Press is a publisher of wide range of journals, and among them four journals are listed in Scopus: International Journal of Sustainable Energy Planning and Management, Journal of Somaesthetics, Journal of China and International Relations and Academic quarter (Journal for humanistic research). Other journals are, for example, Journal of Business Models, Coaching Psychology - The Danish Journal of Coaching Psychology, Journal of Problem Based Learning in Higher Education, Globe: A Journal of Language, Culture and Communication, Music Therapy in Psychiatry Online.

Aalborg University Press was founded in 1978 and it focuses on political science, sociology, media and cultural studies. 
However, according to Scopus, the journal with highest score and number of citations is International Journal of Sustainable Energy Planning and Management, with focus on Energy System analysis, Economics, Socio economics and Feasibility studies as well as specific feasibility studies and analyses of the transition to sustainable energy systems.
All journals are Open Access and most of the journal content is peer-reviewed. Majority of authors are affiliated with Aalborg University (AU), but few of the authors are international scholars, since AU is an international orientated University.

Special action areas and cross-disciplinary research 
AAU conducts research within all faculties. Aalborg University is among the leading universities in the world within health technology research, wireless communication, energy, computer science, innovation economics and comparative welfare studies. AAU has established centres for telecommunication at Birla Institute of Technology in India, at Bandung Institute of Technology in Indonesia, and at the University of Rome. Furthermore, AAU has established a research centre for health technology at Xi'an Jiaotong University in China.

AAU has conducted several experiments in the field of CubeSat technology. The first AAU CubeSat was launched on 30 June 2003, the second (called AAUSAT-II) on 28 April 2008 and the third will be launched in Q1, 2013. After launching AAUSAT3 the fourth will begin development.

AAU has always adopted a cross-disciplinary, problem-based approach to research which often requires contributions from a number of scientific disciplines. Aalborg University has five cross-disciplinary action areas:

 Sustainable energy, the environment and construction;
 Global production, innovation, knowledge development and coherence;
 Information technology;
 Nanotechnology and nanoproduction;
 Experience technology and design.

Cooperative agreements with other universities and colleges 

Aalborg University is a member of the European Consortium of Innovative Universities (ECIU), which was founded in 1997 by 10 European universities. The other 9 European universities are: Dublin City University, Ireland; Linköping University, Sweden; University of Aveiro, Portugal; Autonomous University of Barcelona, Spain; Hamburg University of Technology, Germany; University of Stavanger, Norway; Kaunas University of Technology, Lithuania; Tampere University of Technology, Finland; University of Twente, The Netherlands.

The aim of the ECIU is to create a European network where participating universities can exchange experiences and practices in projects in education, research, and regional development. In 2010, the ECIU consisted of eleven members and three foreign affiliates.

Gallery

Notable alumni and people associated with Aalborg University 
Frank Aaen, Danish economist, former member of Danish Parliament and member of the Red–Green Alliance
Gunhild Moltesen Agger, professor in Danish media history
Erik Bach, Danish composer and music teacher
Louis Becker, Danish architect and lecturer
Jens Blauert, German scientist and emeritus professor
Frede Blaabjerg, World known Danish researcher within the areas of renewable energy and power electronics
Anette Borchorst, Danish Professor
Vladimir Bouchler, Uzbek theatre director and pedagogue
Ann-Dorte Christensen, Danish Professor
Henrik I. Christensen, Danish roboticist and Distinguished Professor
Jesper deClaville Christiansen, Danish professor
Klaus Dittrich, German computer scientist
Jan Fagerberg, Norwegian professor
Bent Flyvbjerg, Danish social scientist
Mette Frederiksen, Danish politician, leader of the Social Democrats and Prime Minister of Denmark
Christopher Freeman, British economist
Christian Graugaard, Danish physician, professor, researcher, commentator, critic, poet and writer
Lars Graugaard, Danish flutist, composer, music teacher and researcher
Carsten Greve, Danish professor
Birkir Hólm Guðnason, Icelandic business leader and CEO of Icelandair
Dorte Hammershøi, Danish Professor
Thomas Blom Hansen, Danish anthropologist
Fredric J. Harris, American professor
Cathrine Hasse, Danish professor with special responsibilities
Christian Geo Heltboe, Danish comedian
Peter Hervik, Danish anthropologist and professor
Arlie Russell Hochschild, American professor
Anders Post Jacobsen, Danish professional football player
Frank Jensen, Danish politician, former Lord Mayor of Copenhagen, a member of Social Democrats and former minister
Anja Jørgensen, Danish Professor
Per Michael Johansen, Danish rector
Rosabeth Moss Kanter, American professor
Finn Kjærsdam, Danish former rector at Aalborg University and professor
Anette Kolmos, Danish Professor
Arnulf Kolstad, Norwegian social psychologist
Mads Mensah Larsen, Danish handball player
Torben Larsen, Danish scientist
Karsten Lauritzen, Danish politician and minister of taxation under Lars Løkke Rasmussen II Cabinet
Steffen Lauritzen, Danish professor
Henrik Lund, Danish engineer and professor
Bengt-Åke Lundvall Danish organizational theorist 
Brian Vad Mathiesen, Danish engineer and professor
Morten Middelfart, Danish entrepreneur, inventor and technologist
Søren Hald Møller, Danish official
Henrik Frystyk Nielsen, Danish engineer and computer scientist
Malene Freudendal-Pedersen, Danish Professor
Anne Phillips, British professor
Vincent Poor, American dean and professor
Zenon J. Pudlowski, Polish engineer and educator
Herbert Pundik, Danish Jewish journalist and author
Toke Reichstein, Danish economist and professor
Mike Sandbothe, German intellectual and philosopher	
Henrik Scharfe, Danish professor
Vashanth Sellathurai, Tamil actor and composer.
Lene Siel, Danish singer
Hege Skjeie, Norwegian political scientist and feminist
David Spiegelhalter, British statistician
Jakob Stoustrup, Danish professor
Emil Wolf, Czech born American physicist
Jonas Kærlev, creator of A Hat in Time.

See also
Centre for Comparative Welfare Studies
 Open access in Denmark

References

External links 
 Official homepage in English

 
Education in Aalborg
Aalborg
Educational institutions established in 1974
1974 establishments in Denmark
Universities and colleges formed by merger in Denmark